Sergio Ramón Rochet Álvarez (born 23 March 1993) is a Uruguayan professional footballer who plays as a goalkeeper for Nacional, whom he captains, and the Uruguay national team.

Club career
Rochet started his career with Danubio with whom he made no appearances.

In April 2014, he went to trial with Dutch club AZ as they wanted a goalkeeper to serve as backup for Esteban Alvarado after the departure of Erik Heijblok. On 19 May 2014, he underwent medicals. Finally on 24 May 2014, he was signed by AZ for a contract until 2016.

Rochet made his debut against FC Dordrecht after Alvarado was injured.

International career
On 5 March 2021, Rochet was named in Uruguay senior team's 35-man preliminary squad for 2022 FIFA World Cup qualifying matches against Argentina and Bolivia. However, CONMEBOL suspended those matches next day amid concern over the COVID-19 pandemic. He made his international debut on 27 January 2022 in a 1–0 win against Paraguay.

Career statistics

Club

International

Honours
AZ
 KNVB Cup runner-up: 2016–17

Nacional
Uruguayan Primera División: 2019, 2020, 2022
Supercopa Uruguaya: 2021

Individual
 Uruguayan Primera División Team of the Year: 2020, 2021, 2022

References

External links
 
 AZ profile

1993 births
Living people
Association football goalkeepers
Uruguayan footballers
Uruguayan people of French descent
Uruguayan people of Jewish descent
Danubio F.C. players
AZ Alkmaar players
Sivasspor footballers
Club Nacional de Football players
Uruguayan Primera División players
Eredivisie players
Süper Lig players
Uruguay youth international footballers
Uruguay under-20 international footballers
Uruguay international footballers
Uruguayan expatriate footballers
Expatriate footballers in the Netherlands
Expatriate footballers in Turkey
People from Colonia Department
2022 FIFA World Cup players